Josef Hilgers (9 September 1858 – 25 January 1918) was a German Jesuit who wrote on theological and ascetical matters. He wrote two books on papal censorship of books and another on the nature of indulgences.

Life
Josef Hilgers was born in Kückhoven on 9 September 1858. From 1885 to 1894 he taught in the city of Ordrupshoj, Denmark. Later he worked in Rome, Luxembourg, Valkenburg and finally in the Bonifatiushaus, in Emmerich, where he died 25 January 1918.

Works (partial list)
Die Kartäuser von London (The Carthusians of London), (1891)
Bernardino Occhino von Siena (Bernardino Occhino of Siena), (1894)
Der Index der verbotenen Bücher, (The Index of Forbidden Books), (1904) 
Die Bücherverbote in Papstbriefen. (1907)
Maria, der Weg zu Christus (Mary, the way to Christ), (1907)
Das goldene Büchlein für Priester und Volk(The golden book for priests and people),  (1910)
Die katholische Lehre von den Ablässen und deren geschichtliche Entwicklung (The Catholic doctrine of indulgences and their historical development, (1913)
 An article on censorship in 16th century Italy in the March 1911 edition of Zentralblatt für Bibliothekswesen.

References

External links
 

1858 births
1918 deaths
People from Erkelenz
19th-century German Catholic theologians
20th-century German Catholic theologians
19th-century German Jesuits
19th-century German male writers
German male non-fiction writers
20th-century German Jesuits
Contributors to the Catholic Encyclopedia